József Turay (1 March 1905 – 24 June 1963) was a Hungarian football forward who played for Hungary in the 1938 FIFA World Cup.

He played with Ferencvárosi TC, MTK Hungária FC and Újvidéki AC in the Hungarian Championship. He also played for Ganz TE.

Fifa World Cup Career

References

External links
 
 

Hungarian footballers
Hungary international footballers
1938 FIFA World Cup players
1905 births
1963 deaths
NAK Novi Sad players
Association football forwards
Sportspeople from Eger